Per Inge Bjørlo (born 20 November 1952, in Ålesund) is a Norwegian sculptor, painter, graphic designer and visual artist. He grew up in Spjelkavik outside Ålesund, and is now living in Hønefoss. He graduated from Bergen Academy of Art and Design in Bergen (1974–1977) and the Norwegian National Academy of Fine Arts in Oslo (1977–1981). He received the Swedish Prince Eugen Medal in 2012.

Bjørlo has had a number of exhibitions of his works in Norway and abroad. He has been represented at exhibitions, among others in São Paulo, Berlin, Venice, Tokyo, New York City and Cologne.

Works of art 

Of his central decoration projects, the series of sculptures in connection to Oslo Airport, Gardermoen, are the most prominent.
Some other works are:
 Thinking, 2002, sandblasted steel sheet outside the University Library in Karlstad, Sweden
 Peeling / Crane, 2002, fiberglass by the main entrance to the University of Agder in Kristiansand, Norway
 Riktning (Direction), 2003, Värnamo in Sweden
 Indre rom VI. Livsløpet (Inner Space VI. The Realm of Life), 2013, stainless steel at Ekebergparken Sculpture Park, Oslo, Norway

References

Literature 
 Per Inge Bjorlo: The Weight of a Lung and the Sound of Crows, Forlaget Press, 2018, 
 Per Inge Bjørlo, Poul Erik Tøjner, Edition Bløndal, Hellerup, 1991,  
 Per Inge Bjørlos potensielle rom, Inger Eri, Museet for Samtidskunst, 2001
 Per Inge Bjørlo – Selected works, Bente Larsen, Galleri Riis, 2007.

20th-century Norwegian painters
Norwegian male painters
21st-century Norwegian painters
People from Ålesund
People from Ringerike (municipality)
1952 births
20th-century Norwegian sculptors
21st-century Norwegian sculptors
Living people
20th-century Norwegian male artists
21st-century Norwegian male artists
Norwegian contemporary artists